Ann Gillespie is a Democratic member of the Illinois Senate for the 27th district. The district, located in the Chicago metropolitan area, includes parts of Arlington Heights, Hoffman Estates, Des Plaines, Mount Prospect, Rolling Meadows, Barrington, Inverness, Palatine, Prospect Heights and South Barrington.

In the 2018 general election, Gillespie defeated incumbent Republican senator Tom Rooney.

Gillespie, a retired healthcare attorney from Arlington Heights, has a B.A. in History from University of Illinois Urbana-Champaign and a J.D. from the DePaul University College of Law.

As of July 2022, Senator Gillespie is a member of the following Illinois Senate committees:

 Appropriations - Constitutional Offices Committee (SAPP-SACO)
 Appropriations - Health Committee (SAPP-SAHA)
 Commerce Committee
 (Chairwoman of) Ethics Committee (SETH)
 Insurance Committee (SINS)
 Local Government Committee (SLGV)
 (Chairwoman of) Redistricting - Northwest Cook County Committee (SRED-SRNC)
 Subcommittee on Managed Care Organizations (SHEA-SMCO)
 (Chairwoman of) Subcommittee on Medicaid (SHEA-SHMD)
 Subcommittee on Special Issues (H) (SHEA-SHSI)

References

External links
 Ann for 27 official campaign website

Living people
Year of birth missing (living people)
21st-century American politicians
21st-century American women politicians
DePaul University College of Law alumni
Democratic Party Illinois state senators
People from Arlington Heights, Illinois
University of Illinois Urbana-Champaign alumni
Women state legislators in Illinois